Ijebu may also refer to:

People
 Ijebu Kingdom, Yoruba kingdom in pre-colonial Nigeria
Ijebu people, an ethnic subtribal group from Nigeria

Places
Ijebu, Owo, a local government area of Ondo State, south-western Nigeria
Ijebu Diocese of the Church of Nigeria
 Ijebu-Ode Diocese of the Catholic Church
Ijebu East, a local government area in Ogun State, Nigeria
Ijebu Igbo, a town in Ogun State, Nigeria
Ijebu Ode, a town in Ogun State, Nigeria
Ijebu North, a local government area in Ogun State, Nigeria
Ijebu North East, a local government area in Ogun State, Nigeria